Otis T. Carr (December 7, 1904 – September 20, 1982) first emerged into the 1950s flying saucer scene in Baltimore, Maryland, in 1955 when he founded OTC Enterprises, a company that was supposed to advance and apply technology originally suggested by Nikola Tesla. The claim to be applying some idea of Tesla's was quite common among exploiters of the flying saucer movement in the 1950s; for example. George Van Tassel's Integratron was supposedly based partially on (unspecified) lore from Tesla, partially on lore from friendly Space Brothers from Venus.

Carr patented a flying saucer, and asserted he was working on a full-size version that could fly to the Moon and return in less than a day, using two counter-rotating metal plates, spinning electromagnets and large capacitors, which when spinning charged and powered by a battery, which became "activated by the energy of space." He named this device the Ezechiel Wheel. Carr's scheme resembles slightly earlier proposals by John R. R. Searl and Thomas Townsend Brown. Carr also claimed to have invented "The Gravity Electric Generator", "The Utron Electric battery", "The Carrotto Gravity Motor", and "The Photon Gun".

Ray Palmer's Fate Magazine gave Carr a great deal of free publicity, not all of it complimentary, throughout the 1950s. Carr and his promoter, Norman Evans Colton, also frequently appeared during the same period on Long John Nebel's pioneering radio and television talk show, and during each appearance, Nebel usually managed to prompt Carr into his usual state of near incoherence; for example, "Can you describe what you're holding in your hand?" "This is a dimensional object. It was designed with the dimensions of space itself. We say it is truly the geometric form of space, because it is completely round and completely square." (Carr was referring to his "Utron Coil", which was round when viewed from above and square when viewed from the side.) The ship was to be powered by Carr also said his great secret could be best expressed mathematically as "minus zero", or "zero X". Colton and Carr did manage to sell quite a bit of stock in their enterprise. Carr also teamed up with obscure contactee Wayne Sulo Aho, and he and Aho toured the various "flying saucer clubs" that then existed in nearly every major city in the United States, touting the wonders of Carr's spacecraft propulsion system.

Although Carr's business affairs were generally considered to be fraudulent, he was granted a patent by the United States Patent and Trademark Office for an "Amusement Device", filed January 22, 1959. In 1958 Carr struck a deal with the owner of an amusement park, Frontier City, in Oklahoma City, Oklahoma. Apparently, the terms of the deal were that Carr would construct a full-scale, 45-foot (14 m) mockup of his saucer, OTC X-1, to be converted into a ride for the park. Carr relocated to Oklahoma City, provided the park with a dummy OTC X-1, and claimed to be readying a 6-foot (1.8 m) "prototype" of his saucer for a demonstration flight at the fairground. Carr said his demonstration model would rise to about 500 feet. He also said he would follow that triumph on December 7, 1959 by launching a working 45-foot saucer, matching the amusement park mockup, and, with Wayne Sulo Aho and himself as pilots, would fly from the fairground site to the Moon and return in a few hours. The 6-foot saucer demonstration was supposed to have been launched on April 19, 1959, but it never even made it to the fairground, and neither did Carr, who claimed to be feeling "unwell" on the day of his demonstration. Visitors to Carr's factory site during the period did not see any actual working models, or otherwise, of either the 6-foot or 45-foot saucers. Instead, they were shown a small and motionless "three dimensional illustration of Carr's ideas" made mainly of wood. Carr had already dropped from sight before the launch date for the 6-foot model, and was not seen for quite some time thereafter.

In January 1961, Carr was convicted of "the crime of selling securities without registering the same" in Oklahoma, and fined $5,000, far less than the sums he had obtained from investors in the area. He was denied an appeal on March 1, 1961. Carr could not pay the fine, and served part of a 14-year jail term. Carr fled the state and soon resurfaced elsewhere, still selling non-working "free energy" technology. Aho was found to be an innocent dupe. After his sentence ended, Carr lived in Pittsburgh, Pennsylvania. In 1966 he claimed that the reason his earlier demonstrations failed was simply that he had not had enough time to finish the device. He died in 1982.

References

 Curran, Douglas: In Advance of the Landing, NY, NY: Abbeville Press, 1985. .
 Lewis, James R., editor, UFOs and Popular Culture, Santa Barbara, CA: ABC-CLIO, Inc., 2000. .
 Social Security Death Index lists him as born December 7, 1904 and day of death in September 1982, with his last residence at 15221 Pittsburgh, Allegheny, Pennsylvania. His Social Security number was issued in Ohio.

External links 
 Transcription of part of a Long John Nebel interview with Carr
 Uncritical collection of material on Carr
 Carr's 1961 Oklahoma appeal
 Material on another Carr forerunner and competitor, T. T. Brown
 Aquamarine Dreams: Ralph Ring and Otis T. Carr
 Cincinnati Skeptics newsletter including short biography of Otis T. Carr
 O.T. Carr "Amusement Device" US Patent #2,912,224 (filed January 22, 1959)
 Ralph Ring's website who worked with Carr and flew in the OTC-X1. Includes documentation from his work with Carr, radio interviews, transcripts of interviews and numerous interviews of Ralph Ring discussing his understandings of the principles of Nature involved with these craft.

UFO-related phenomena
1904 births
1982 deaths